Ro-116 was an Imperial Japanese Navy Ro-100-class submarine. Completed and commissioned in January 1944, she served in World War II and was sunk in May 1944 during her second war patrol.

Design and description
The Ro-100 class was a medium-sized, coastal submarine derived from the preceding Kaichū type. They displaced  surfaced and  submerged.

For surface running, the boats were powered by two  diesel engines, each driving one propeller shaft. When submerged each propeller was driven by a  electric motor. They could reach  on the surface and  underwater.

The boats were armed with four internal bow  torpedo tubes and carried a total of eight torpedoes. They were also armed with two single mounts for  Type 96 anti-aircraft guns or a single  L/40 AA gun.

Construction and commissioning

Ro-116 was laid down as Submarine No. 407 on 16 January 1943 by Kawasaki at Senshu, Japan. She was renamed Ro-116 on 5 July 1943 and was attached provisionally to the Yokosuka Naval District that day. She was launched on 13 September 1943, then was towed to Kawasaki's shipyard at Kobe, Japan, for fitting-out. She was completed and commissioned at Kobe on 21 January 1944.

Service history

January–March 1944

Upon commissioning, Ro-116 was attached formally to the Yokosuka Naval District and was assigned to Submarine Squadron 11 for workups. She called at the 3rd Fuel Depot at Tokuyama, Japan, from 28 to 29 March 1944 to refuel.

First war patrol

Ro-116 got underway from Japan on 31 March 1944 along with the submarine  for her first war patrol, ordered to intercept an Allied task force operating in the vicinity of the Palau Islands. She did not find the task force, and returned to Japan on 13 April 1944.

Second war patrol

On 4 May 1944, Ro-116 was reassigned to Submarine Division 51 in Submarine Squadron 7 in the 6th Fleet. She departed Kure, Japan, that day bound for Saipan in the Mariana Islands, which she reached on 10 May 1944.

The picket line was tasked with providing warning of any move toward the Palau Islands by Allied invasion forces.

On 18 May 1944, U.S. Navy signals intelligence personnel intercepted and decrypted Japanese signals indicating the formation of Scouting Line NA between Truk and the Admiralties. After England sank I-16 on 19 May 1944, the hunter-killer group turned its attention to Scouting Line NA and had its first successes against the line when England sank Ro-106 on 22 May 1944 and Ro-104 on 23 May 1944.

Loss

Ro-116 submerged at 01:28, causing George to lose contact. After sunrise, debris was recovered from the ocean's surface in the area.

On 25 June 1944, the Imperial Japanese Navy declared Ro-116 to be presumed lost north of the Admiralty Islands with all 56 men on board. The Japanese struck her from the Navy list on 10 August 1944.

Notes

References
 

1943 ships
Ships built by Kawasaki Heavy Industries
World War II submarines of Japan
Japanese submarines lost during World War II
Ro-100-class submarines
Maritime incidents in May 1944
World War II shipwrecks in the Pacific Ocean
Submarines sunk by United States warships
Ships lost with all hands